Laidley Creek West is a locality in the Lockyer Valley Region, Queensland, Australia.

History 
The locality was named on 3 June 1994. Its name is derived from Laidley Creek, which itself is derived from the naming of Laidleys Plain by Allan Cunningham on 22 June 1829, after James Laidley, the New South Wales Deputy Commissary General.

References 

Lockyer Valley Region
Localities in Queensland